Kieron Thomas Bowie (born 21 September 2002) is a Scottish footballer who plays as a forward for EFL League Two club Northampton Town on loan from Fulham.

Club career

Raith Rovers (2019–2020)
Kieron had previously played for Glenrothes Strollers and the Fife Elite Football Academy before a move to his supported club Raith Rovers.

He broke into the first team aged only 16 in the tailend of the 2018–19 season as he made four appearances for the Fife-based club. He then went on to make 35 appearances in all competitions the following season, scoring 10 goals and helping the club to a Scottish League One title and promotion to the Championship.

Fulham (2020–present)
Kieron officially joined Fulham on 1 July 2020 after a pre-contract agreement that was made the previous February.

Northampton Town (loan)
On 12 July 2022, Bowie joined EFL League Two club Northampton Town on a season-long loan.

International career
Bowie received his first call-up to the Scotland under-21 team in May 2021. He made his first appearance, as a substitute, in a 2–1 defeat against Northern Ireland on 2 June 2021.

Career statistics

References

External links

Living people
2002 births
Footballers from Kirkcaldy
Scottish footballers
Association football forwards
Raith Rovers F.C. players
Fulham F.C. players
Northampton Town F.C. players
Scottish Professional Football League players